Atlas Eclipticalis may refer to:
Atlas eclipticalis, 1950.0 a 1958 atlas of stars by Antonín Bečvář
Atlas Eclipticalis, a 1961–1962 composition by John Cage